CD34 is a transmembrane phosphoglycoprotein protein encoded by the CD34 gene in humans, mice, rats and other species.

CD34 derives its name from the cluster of differentiation protocol that identifies cell surface antigens. CD34 was first described on hematopoietic stem cells independently by Civin et al. and Tindle et al. as a cell surface glycoprotein and functions as a cell-cell adhesion factor. It may also mediate the attachment of hematopoietic stem cells to bone marrow extracellular matrix or directly to stromal cells. Clinically, it is associated with the selection and enrichment of hematopoietic stem cells for bone marrow transplants. Due to these historical and clinical associations, CD34 expression is almost ubiquitously related to hematopoietic cells; however, it is actually found on many other cell types as well.

Function 

The CD34 protein is a member of a family of single-pass transmembrane sialomucin proteins that show expression on early haematopoietic and vascular-associated progenitor cells. However, little is known about its exact function.

CD34 is also an important adhesion molecule and is required for T cells to enter lymph nodes. It is expressed on lymph node endothelia, whereas the L-selectin to which it binds is on the T cell.  Conversely, under other circumstances CD34 has been shown to act as molecular "Teflon" and block mast cell, eosinophil and dendritic cell precursor adhesion, and to facilitate opening of vascular lumina. Finally, recent data suggest CD34 may also play a more selective role in chemokine-dependent migration of eosinophils and dendritic cell precursors.  Regardless of its mode of action, under all circumstances CD34, and its relatives podocalyxin and endoglycan, facilitates cell migration.

Tissue distribution 

Cells expressing CD34 (CD34+ cell) are normally found in the umbilical cord and bone marrow as haematopoietic cells, or in endothelial progenitor cells, endothelial cells of blood vessels but not lymphatics (except pleural lymphatics), mast cells, a sub-population of dendritic cells (which are factor XIIIa-negative) in the interstitium and around the adnexa of dermis of skin, as well as cells in soft tissue tumors like DFSP, GIST, SFT, HPC, and to some degree in MPNSTs, etc. The presence of CD34 on non-hematopoietic cells in various tissues has been linked to progenitor and adult stem cell phenotypes.

It is important to mention that Long-Term Haematopoietic Stem Cells (LT-HSCs) in mice and humans are the haematopoietic cells with the greatest self-renewal capacity and were shown to be CD34+ and CD38− cell fraction within the lineage-depleted cell population (LIn−). Human HSCs express the CD34 marker. Later studies have reported that low rhodamine retention identifies LT-HSCs within the Lin−CD34+CD38− population.

CD34 is expressed in roughly 20% of murine haematopoietic stem cells, and can be stimulated and reversed.

Clinical applications 

CD34+ is often used clinically to quantify the number of haemopoietic stem cells for use in haemopoietic stem cell transplantation. This is generally a useful marker for cell dosing although there is some evidence that the CD34+ quantification may not be reliable in some circumstances. CD34+ cells may be isolated from blood samples using immunomagnetic techniques and used for CD34+ transplants, which have lower rates of graft-versus-host disease.

Antibodies are used to quantify and purify hematopoietic progenitor stem cells for research and for clinical bone marrow transplantation. However, counting CD34+ mononuclear cells may overestimate myeloid blasts in bone marrow smears due to hematogones (B lymphocyte precursors) and CD34+ megakaryocytes.

Cells observed as CD34+ and CD38- are of an undifferentiated, primitive form; i.e., they are multipotent hematopoietic stem cells. Thus, because of their CD34+ expression, such undifferentiated cells can be sorted out.

In tumors, CD34 is found in alveolar soft part sarcoma, preB-ALL (positive in 75%), AML (40%), AML-M7 (most), dermatofibrosarcoma protuberans, gastrointestinal stromal tumors, giant cell fibroblastoma, granulocytic sarcoma, Kaposi’s sarcoma, liposarcoma, malignant fibrous histiocytoma, malignant peripheral nerve sheath tumors, meningeal hemangiopericytomas, meningiomas, neurofibromas, schwannomas, and papillary thyroid carcinoma.

A negative CD34 may exclude Ewing's sarcoma/PNET, myofibrosarcoma of the breast, and inflammatory myofibroblastic tumors of the stomach.

Injection of CD34+ hematopoietic stem cells has been clinically applied to treat various diseases including spinal cord injury, liver cirrhosis and peripheral vascular disease.

Interactions 

CD34 has been shown to interact with CRKL.  It also interacts with L-selectin, important in inflammation. CD34- has been related to hair follicles' melanocyte regeneration and CD34+ with neuronal regeneration.

See also 
 Cluster of differentiation
 List of histologic stains that aid in diagnosis of cutaneous conditions

References

Further reading

External links 
 
 Mouse CD Antigen Chart
 Human CD Antigen Chart
 

Clusters of differentiation
Cell adhesion molecules